Cristen Joan "Christen" Westphal (born September 2, 1993) is an American professional soccer player who plays as a defender for San Diego Wave FC. She previously played for the Portland Thorns, Reign FC, and Boston Breakers, as well as the United States women's national under-23 soccer team. She played collegiate soccer for the Florida Gators.

Collegiate career
Westphal attended the University of Florida where she played as a center back for the Florida Gators women's soccer team from 2012–15. Her senior year, TopDrawerSoccer named her one of the top 10 women's soccer defenders in the NCAA's Division 1. The same year she was named Southeastern Conference Soccer Defender of the Year. Westphal was named to the All-SEC team every year of her collegiate career, and was named to the SEC first team three consecutive years. Her senior year, she led the Gators (and tied for first in the SEC) in assists with 10 and was named as a Hermann Trophy semifinalist.

Club career

Boston Breakers, 2016–17
Westphal was drafted by Boston Breakers in the first round of the 2016 NWSL College Draft. She signed with Boston in March 2016 and made her debut on April 16, 2016 against Washington Spirit. During her rookie season, she was a starting defender in 7 of the 13 games in which she played and scored one goal. The goal against the Western New York Flash was nominated for Goal of the Week. During the 2017 season, Westphal started in all 13 games that she played and recorded an assist. A right foot injury endured in a match against Seattle on July 15 ended her season prematurely. The Breakers finished the 2017 season in ninth place with a  record.

Reign FC, 2018–19
Westphal was selected by the Reign FC in the 2018 NWSL Dispersal Draft after Boston folded unexpectedly ahead of the 2018 season.

Portland Thorns, 2020–21
Westphal was out of contract after the 2019 season, and her NWSL rights were traded to Portland Thorns.

San Diego Wave, 2022–
Immediately after the 2022 NWSL Expansion Draft, it was announced that San Diego Wave acquired the rights to Westphal and Amirah Ali from Portland via trade. San Diego had passed on several picks, instead negotiating the trade.

International career
Westphal has represented the United States on the under-23 national team She competed at the 2015 Four Nations Tournament in Norway and helped the U.S. win the tournament.

Honors and awards

Club
Portland Thorns FC
 NWSL Community Shield : 2020
 NWSL Challenge Cup: 2021
 International Champions Cup: 2021
 NWSL Shield: 2021

References

External links

 
 Boston Breakers player profile
Florida Gators bio
 

1993 births
Living people
American women's soccer players
Boston Breakers draft picks
Boston Breakers players
Florida Gators women's soccer players
National Women's Soccer League players
People from Brecksville, Ohio
OL Reign players
Soccer players from Ohio
Sportspeople from Cuyahoga County, Ohio
Women's association football defenders
Portland Thorns FC players
OL Reign draft picks
San Diego Wave FC players